Horsch (alternatively Hörsch) is a German surname. Notable people with the surname include:

 Adolphe Horsch (1864–1937), Alsatian playwright
 Elizabeth Horsch Bender (1895-1988), American Mennonite editor and translator
 Helmut Horsch (born 1948), German football player and manager
 John Horsch (1867-1941), Mennonite historian and writer
 Lucie Horsch (born 1999), Dutch recorder player
 Marcel Horsch (1889–?), Belgian weightlifter
 R. C. Hörsch (born 1943), American photographer, filmmaker, writer, sculptor and musician

German-language surnames